Indiopsocus is a genus of common barklice in the family Psocidae. There are more than 30 described species in Indiopsocus.

Species
These 39 species belong to the genus Indiopsocus:

 Indiopsocus abouchaari (Badonnel, 1986)
 Indiopsocus acraeus (Thornton & Woo, 1973)
 Indiopsocus affinis Mockford, 1974
 Indiopsocus alticola Mockford, 1974
 Indiopsocus bisignatus (Banks, 1904)
 Indiopsocus camagueyensis Mockford, 1974
 Indiopsocus campestris (Aaron, 1886)
 Indiopsocus campestroides Mockford, 2012
 Indiopsocus caraibensis Badonnel, 1989
 Indiopsocus caribe Mockford, 2012
 Indiopsocus ceterus Mockford, 1974
 Indiopsocus coquilletti (Banks, 1920)
 Indiopsocus cristatus (New & Thornton, 1981)
 Indiopsocus cubanus (Banks, 1908)
 Indiopsocus dentatus (Thornton & Woo, 1973)
 Indiopsocus denticulatus Garcia Aldrete, 1999
 Indiopsocus etiennei Badonnel, 1989
 Indiopsocus expansus (New & Thornton, 1975)
 Indiopsocus fallax Mockford, 2012
 Indiopsocus fittkaui (Badonnel, 1986)
 Indiopsocus hilburni Mockford, 1989
 Indiopsocus infumatus (Banks, 1907)
 Indiopsocus jamaicensis Turner, 1975
 Indiopsocus lacteus Mockford & Young, 2015
 Indiopsocus lanceolatus Mockford & Young, 2015
 Indiopsocus mendeli Lienhard, 2011
 Indiopsocus microvariegatus Mockford, 1974
 Indiopsocus nebulosus Mockford, 1989
 Indiopsocus obrieni Badonnel, 1989
 Indiopsocus palisadensis Turner, 1975
 Indiopsocus pallidus Mockford, 1974
 Indiopsocus palmatus Mockford & Young, 2015
 Indiopsocus paranensis (New & Thornton, 1975)
 Indiopsocus pulcher Turner, 1975
 Indiopsocus rosalesi Mockford, 1996
 Indiopsocus sinuatistigma (New, 1972)
 Indiopsocus texanus (Aaron, 1886)
 Indiopsocus ubiquitus Mockford, 1974
 Indiopsocus variegatus Mockford, 1974

References

Psocidae
Articles created by Qbugbot